Red Tape is an album by the American Southern rock band Atlanta Rhythm Section, released in 1976.

Track listing
"Jukin" (Buie, Nix, Wills) – 3:43
"Mixed Emotions" (Buie, Cobb, Nix) – 3:20
"Shanghied" (Buie, Cobb, Nix) – 2:14
"Police! Police!" (Buie, Cobb, Nix) – 3:11
"Beautiful Dreamers" (Buie, Cobb, Nix) – 3:26
"Oh What a Feeling" (Bailey, Buie, Nix) – 2:39
"Free Spirit" (Buie, Hammond, Nix) – 3:35
"Another Man's Woman" (Bailey, Buie, Daughtry, Nix) – 9:47

Personnel
Barry Bailey - guitar
Buddy Buie - vocals
J.R. Cobb - guitar, backing vocals
Dean Daughtry - keyboards
Paul Goddard - bass guitar
Ronnie Hammond - vocals, backing vocals
Robert Nix - percussion, drums, backing vocals

Production
Producer: Buddy Buie
Engineer: Rodney Mills

Charts
Album

Singles

References

Atlanta Rhythm Section albums
1976 albums
Albums produced by Buddy Buie
Polydor Records albums